Scalicus quadratorostratus s a species of marine ray-finned fish belonging to the family Peristediidae, the armoured gurnards or armored sea robins. It is found in the Indo-West Pacific where it has been recorded from Madagascar, New Caledonia, Taiwan and Japan.

References 

quadratorostratus
Animals described in 1979
Taxa named by Pierre Fourmanoir